Kazan Optical-Mechanical Plant is a company based in Kazan, Russia and established in 1940.

The Kazan Optical-Mechanical Plant Production Association is one of the largest Russian optical companies. It develops and produces a wide range of optical-electronic and optical-mechanical instruments, including submarine periscopes, aerial cameras, satellite cameras, laser rangefinders, binoculars and night-vision instruments.

 The plant has a design bureau.

References

External links
 Official website

Manufacturing companies of Russia
Companies based in Kazan
Ministry of the Defense Industry (Soviet Union)
Defence companies of the Soviet Union